Lytkarino Optical Glass Plant is a company based in Lytkarino, Russia and established in 1934. It is part of the Shvabe Holding of the state-owned Rostec corporation.

The Lytkarino Optical Glass Plant is a major producer of optical glass and precision optical instruments for the military as well as for the civilian market, producing night vision devices and glass laser optics.

See also
 Rubinar
 BTA-6

References

External links
 Official website

Manufacturing companies of Russia
Companies based in Moscow Oblast
Shvabe Holding
Defence companies of the Soviet Union
Manufacturing companies of the Soviet Union
Ministry of Medium Machine Building